Sir Stephen Henry Parker  (7 November 1846 – 13 December 1927) was a lawyer and Chief Justice of the Supreme Court of Western Australia from 1906 to 1914.

Biography

Early life
Stephen Henry Parker was the second son of Stephen Stanley Parker (1817–1904) and his wife Elizabeth, née Sewell. He was the grandson of Stephen Parker (1879), a pioneer settler in York, Western Australia. Parker was educated at the Bishop's School, Perth, and was called to the bar in 1868.

Career
He became a member of the Western Australian Legislative Council and advocated responsible government for the colony. In 1878 he moved for the introduction of a bill to amend the constitution, but this motion was defeated. A constitution bill for responsible government was passed by the Legislative Council on 26 April 1889, but was met with some opposition in the British House of Commons. It was suggested and agreed that a delegation consisting of the retiring governor, Sir Frederick Broome, Sir Thomas Cockburn-Campbell and Parker should go to London to see the bill through the British parliament. The delegation was able to give a good answer to all objections raised, and subsequently the bill was passed and became law.

He served as colonial secretary in the John Forrest ministry from October 1892 to December 1894 when he retired. He was also chairman of the Perth City Council from November 1877 to 1879, for a few months in 1880-81 and Mayor from February to October 1892. In 1881, he joined with his brother George to form the well known law firm Parker and Parker (which in 1997 merged with the Perth office of Freehill Hollingdale & Page).

Personal life and death
He married Amey Katharine Leake, daughter of George Walpole Leake on 27 July 1872.  She died in 1914.  They had four sons and seven daughters who reached adulthood. Their second son Hubert Stanley Wyborn Parker (1883-1966) was the member of the Western Australian Legislative Assembly for North-East Fremantle in 1930-33, and of the Western Australian Legislative Council for Metropolitan-Suburban province in 1934-54. He was attorney-general for two months in 1933 and chief secretary in 1948-50.

Parker, and his brother George, were heavily involved with the East Perth (now known as Perth) Cricket Club in the W.A.C.A. Competition. He was club President from 1899 to 1903.

He died on 13 December 1927.

See also
 Judiciary of Australia

References
G. C. Bolton, Wendy Birman, 'Parker, Sir Stephen Henry (1846 - 1927)', Australian Dictionary of Biography, Volume 11, MUP, 1988, pp 138–140. 

1846 births
1927 deaths
Mayors and Lord Mayors of Perth, Western Australia
Australian Knights Commander of the Order of St Michael and St George
Chief Justices of Western Australia
Judges of the Supreme Court of Western Australia
Australian people of English descent